LTT 1445Ab is an exoplanet that was discovered in 2019. The planet is located about 22 light years away from Earth and takes 5 days to orbit its star, which in turn orbits three sibling stars.

In 2022, a planetary transmission spectrum has showed no evidence for the atmosphere, although atmosphere with high altitude hazes cannot be ruled out yet.

References 

Exoplanets discovered in 2019
Exoplanets discovered by TESS